Guisa is a municipality and town in the Granma Province of Cuba.

Demographics
In 2003, the municipality of Guisa had a population of 50,923.

See also
Municipalities of Cuba
List of cities in Cuba

References

External links

Populated places in Granma Province